Come Across is a 1929 American crime film directed by Ray Taylor and written by Peter Milne, Jack Rollens, Monte Carter and Ford Beebe. The film stars Lina Basquette, Reed Howes, Flora Finch, Crauford Kent, Gustav von Seyffertitz and Clarissa Selwynne. The film was released on June 30, 1929, by Universal Pictures.

Cast        
Lina Basquette as Mary Houston
Reed Howes as Harry Fraser
Flora Finch as Cassie
Crauford Kent as George Harcourt
Gustav von Seyffertitz as Pop Hanson
Clarissa Selwynne as Harriet Houston

References

External links
 

1929 films
American crime films
1929 crime films
Universal Pictures films
Films directed by Ray Taylor
American silent feature films
American black-and-white films
1920s English-language films
1920s American films